Up and Down is an EP by She Wants Revenge. The EP was released on September 22, 2009.

Track listing
"Your Love" – 3:35
"All Wound Up (feat. Zina Star)" – 3:44
"Animal Attraction" – 3:40
"A Little Bit Harder Now" – 2:54
"Love Me" – 4:14

References

2009 EPs
She Wants Revenge albums